The 2016 BSN season was the 87th season of the Baloncesto Superior Nacional.

Teams

2016 teams

Regular season

League table
May 10, 2016

Green Qualified for the playoffs
Red Eliminated

Playoffs

Statistical leaders

Points

Rebounds

Assists

Blocks

Awards

Season Awards 
Most Valuable Player: Ángel Daniel Vassallo, Leones de Ponce
Rookie of the Year: Ismael Romero, Atléticos de San Germán
Coach of the Year: Allans Colón, Santeros de Aguada
Sixth Man of the Year: Mike Rosario, Cangrejeros de Santurce

References

External links 
 Official site 

Baloncesto Superior Nacional
2016 in Puerto Rican sports
2015–16 in American basketball